Castello del Matese is a comune (municipality) in the Province of Caserta in the Italian region Campania, located about  north of Naples and about  north of Caserta.

Sports

Association football 
Prima Categoria Molise (Group A) club A.S.D. Castello Matese play home matches at the Campo Sportivo Italo Pastore, a municipal stadium in Castello del Matese. The club was founded in 2017.

References

External links
 Official website

Cities and towns in Campania